Madiha Shah is a Pakistani film and stage actor, and dancer. She was active in film during the 1990s.

Career
Shah began her career as a model, and one of her friends introduced her to television. Shah's first play, was the Punjabi-language Hari Bhari Chhaon, which was broadcast on Lahore Television. In 1989, Shah performed in Rashid Dar's television play Sauraj Ke Sath Saath, in which she played the role of a physically disabled girl. After that she appeared in a number of serials and plays. 

Shah appeared in numerous films afterward, and by the 1990s, she was also pursuing a career in theatre dramas, such as Janam Janam Ki Meli Chadar. Shah also worked in stage shows as a dancer. In 2009 Shah performed a minor role in Syed Noor's film Majajan.

In 2015, Shah was pursuing interests in fashion design, and held a fashion exhibition in Karachi, Pakistan in July of that year.

Personal
Shah was  married in her early teen years with Syed Wajid Ali Shah (who was divorced and single parent of one girl later became model), they got divorced in six months of marriage.  Shah married Javed Iqbal in 2006 but announced there marriage formally in November 2014.

Her family initially disapproved of her career in films, but eventually her mother accepted her daughter's decision to be an actress as she was her only daughter.Her father was in army on lower rank and sayed by cast, he was against her career in industry but died in her 20’s.

Notable films

 Bulandi (1990)
 Nagina
 Nighaheen
 Nargis
 Irrada 
 International Luteray
 Zameen Aasman
 Laat Sahib
 Main Ne Pyar Kiya
 Pyasa Sawan
 Nangey Paoon
 Munda Kashmiri
 Main Jeena Chahti Hoon
 Naila
 Aashqi
 Gulfam
 Majajan
 phool
 tragopan
 Munda shararti
 Be nam badshah
 Awargi
and many more….

References

1970 births
Living people
Pakistani film actresses
Pakistani stage actresses
Punjabi people
Actresses from Lahore
20th-century Pakistani actresses
21st-century Pakistani actresses